Kalpana is a 1970 Indian Malayalam film,  directed by K. S. Sethumadhavan. The film stars Prem Nazir, Sathyan, Sheela in the lead roles. Sheela acted in equally important dual roles and a small third role. This was the first dual role of Sheela and the first ever well made, seamless double act in Malayalam cinema. The film had musical score by V. Dakshinamoorthy.

Cast
Prem Nazir as Surendran
Sathyan as Balan
Sheela as Sushama, Susheela and Kalpana  
Kaviyoor Ponnamma as Surendran's Mother
Adoor Bhasi as Nanu
T. S. Muthaiah as Kalpana's Father
Meena as Lakshmi

Soundtrack
The music was composed by V. Dakshinamoorthy and the lyrics were written by Vayalar Ramavarma.

References

External links
 

1970 films
1970s Malayalam-language films
Films directed by K. S. Sethumadhavan